A physical constant, sometimes fundamental physical constant or universal constant, is a physical quantity that is generally believed to be both universal in nature and have constant value in time. It is distinct from a mathematical constant, which has a fixed numerical value, but does not directly involve any physical measurement.

There are many physical constants in science, some of the most widely recognized being the speed of light in vacuum c, the gravitational constant G, the Planck constant h, the electric constant ε0, and the elementary charge e. Physical constants can take many dimensional forms: the speed of light signifies a maximum speed for any object and its dimension is length divided by time; while the fine-structure constant α, which characterizes the strength of the electromagnetic interaction, is dimensionless.

The term fundamental physical constant is sometimes used to refer to universal-but-dimensioned physical constants such as those mentioned above. Increasingly, however, physicists only use fundamental physical constant for dimensionless physical constants, such as the fine-structure constant α.

Physical constant, as discussed here, should not be confused with other quantities called "constants", which are assumed to be constant in a given context without being fundamental, such as the "time constant" characteristic of a given system, or material constants (e.g., Madelung constant, electrical resistivity, and heat capacity).

Since May 2019, all of the SI base units have been defined in terms of physical constants. As a result, five constants: the speed of light in vacuum, c; the Planck constant, h; the elementary charge, e; the Avogadro constant, NA; and the Boltzmann constant, kB, have known exact numerical values when expressed in SI units.   The first three of these constants are fundamental constants, whereas NA and kB are of a technical nature only: they do not describe any property of the universe, but instead only give a proportionality factor for defining the units used with large numbers of atomic-scale entities.

Choice of units 
Whereas the physical quantity indicated by a physical constant does not depend on the unit system used to express the quantity, the numerical values of dimensional physical constants do depend on choice of unit system. 
The term "physical constant" refers to the physical quantity, and not to the numerical value within any given system of units. For example, the speed of light is defined as having the numerical value of  when expressed in the SI unit metres per second, and as having the numerical value of 1 when expressed in the natural units Planck length per Planck time. While its numerical value can be defined at will by the choice of units, the speed of light itself is a single physical constant.

Any ratio between physical constants of the same dimensions results in a dimensionless physical constant, for example, the proton-to-electron mass ratio. Any relation between physical quantities can be expressed as a relation between dimensionless ratios via a process known as nondimensionalisation.

The term of "fundamental physical constant" is reserved for physical quantities which, according to the current state of knowledge, are regarded as immutable and as non-derivable from more fundamental principles. Notable examples are the speed of light c, and the gravitational constant G.

The fine-structure constant α is the best known dimensionless fundamental physical constant. It is the value of the elementary charge squared expressed in Planck units. This value has become a standard example when discussing the derivability or non-derivability of physical constants. Introduced by Arnold Sommerfeld, its value as determined at the time was consistent with 1/137. This motivated Arthur Eddington (1929) to construct an argument why its value might be 1/137 precisely, which related to the Eddington number, his estimate of the number of protons in the Universe. By the 1940s, it became clear that the value of the fine-structure constant deviates significantly from the precise value of 1/137, refuting Eddington's argument.

With the development of quantum chemistry in the 20th century, however, a vast number of previously inexplicable dimensionless physical constants were successfully computed from theory. In light of that, some theoretical physicists still hope for continued progress in explaining the values of other dimensionless physical constants.

It is known that the Universe would be very different if these constants took values significantly different from those we observe. For example, a few percent change in the value of the fine structure constant would be enough to eliminate stars like the Sun. This has prompted attempts at anthropic explanations of the values of some of the dimensionless fundamental physical constants.

Natural units

It is possible to combine dimensional universal physical constants to define fixed quantities of any desired dimension, and this property has been used to construct various systems of natural units of measurement.  Depending on the choice and arrangement of constants used, the resulting natural units may be convenient to an area of study. For example, Planck units, constructed from c, G, ħ, and kB give conveniently sized measurement units for use in studies of quantum gravity, and Hartree atomic units, constructed from ħ, me, e and 4πε0 give convenient units in atomic physics.  The choice of constants used leads to widely varying quantities.

Number of fundamental constants
The number of fundamental physical constants depends on the physical theory accepted as "fundamental". 
Currently,  this is the theory of general relativity for gravitation and the Standard Model for electromagnetic, weak and strong nuclear interactions and the matter fields.
Between them, these theories account for a total of 19 independent fundamental constants. 
There is, however, no single "correct" way of enumerating them, as it is a matter of arbitrary choice which quantities are considered "fundamental" and which as "derived". Uzan (2011) lists 22 "unknown constants" in the fundamental theories, which give rise to 19 "unknown dimensionless parameters", as follows: 
the gravitational constant G, 
the speed of light c,
the Planck constant h,
the 9 Yukawa couplings for the quarks and leptons (equivalent to specifying the rest mass of these elementary particles),
2 parameters of the Higgs field potential,
4 parameters for the quark mixing matrix, 
3 coupling constants for the gauge groups SU(3) × SU(2) × U(1) (or equivalently, two coupling constants and the Weinberg angle),
a phase for the QCD vacuum.
The number of 19 independent fundamental physical constants is subject to change under possible extensions of the Standard Model, notably by the introduction of neutrino mass (equivalent to seven additional constants, i.e. 3 Yukawa couplings and 4 lepton mixing parameters).

The discovery of variability in any of these constants would be equivalent to the discovery of "new physics".

 proposed a classification schemes of three types of constants: 
A: physical properties of particular objects
B: characteristic of a class of physical phenomena
C: universal constants
The same physical constant may move from one category to another as the understanding of its role deepens; this has notably happened to the speed of light, which was a class A constant (characteristic of light) when it was first measured, but became a class B constant (characteristic of electromagnetic phenomena) with the development of classical electromagnetism, and finally a class C constant with the discovery of special relativity.

Tests on time-independence 

By definition, fundamental physical constants are subject to measurement, so that their being constant (independent on both the time and position of the performance of the measurement) is necessarily an experimental result and subject to verification.

Paul Dirac in 1937 speculated that physical constants such as the gravitational constant or the fine-structure constant might be subject to change over time in proportion of the age of the universe. Experiments can in principle only put an upper bound on the relative change per year. For the fine-structure constant, this upper bound is comparatively low, at
roughly 10−17 per year (as of 2008).

The gravitational constant is much more difficult to measure with precision, and conflicting measurements in the 2000s have inspired the controversial suggestions of a periodic variation of its value in a 2015 paper. However, while its value is not known to great precision, the possibility of observing type Ia supernovae which happened in the universe's remote past, paired with the assumption that the physics involved in these events is universal, allows for an upper bound of less than 10−10 per year for the gravitational constant over the last nine billion years.

Similarly, an upper bound of the change in the proton-to-electron mass ratio has been placed at 10−7 over a period of 7 billion years (or 10−16 per year) in a 2012 study based on the observation of methanol in a distant galaxy.

It is problematic to discuss the proposed rate of change (or lack thereof) of a single dimensional physical constant in isolation. The reason for this is that the choice of units is arbitrary, making the question of whether a constant is undergoing change an artefact of the choice (and definition) of the units.

For example, in SI units, the speed of light was given a defined value in 1983. Thus, it was meaningful to experimentally measure the speed of light in SI units prior to 1983, but it is not so now. Similarly, with effect from May 2019, the Planck constant has a defined value, such that all SI base units are now defined in terms of fundamental physical constants. With this change, the international prototype of the kilogram is being retired as the last physical object used in the definition of any SI unit.

Tests on the immutability of physical constants look at dimensionless quantities, i.e. ratios between quantities of like dimensions, in order to escape this problem. Changes in physical constants are not meaningful if they result in an observationally indistinguishable universe. For example, a "change" in the speed of light c would be meaningless if accompanied by a corresponding change in the elementary charge e so that the ratio  (the fine-structure constant) remained unchanged.

Fine-tuned universe 

Some physicists have explored the notion that if the dimensionless physical constants had sufficiently different values, our Universe would be so radically different that intelligent life would probably not have emerged, and that our Universe therefore seems to be fine-tuned for intelligent life. However, the phase space of the possible constants and their values is unknowable, so any conclusions drawn from such arguments are unsupported. The anthropic principle states a logical truism: the fact of our existence as intelligent beings who can measure physical constants requires those constants to be such that beings like us can exist. There are a variety of interpretations of the constants' values, including that of a divine creator (the apparent fine-tuning is actual and intentional), or that the universe is one universe of many in a multiverse (e.g. the many-worlds interpretation of quantum mechanics), or even that, if information is an innate property of the universe and logically inseparable from consciousness, a universe without the capacity for conscious beings cannot exist.

Table of physical constants

The table below lists some frequently used constants and their CODATA recommended values.  For a more extended list, refer to List of physical constants.

See also
 List of common physics notations

References

 .

External links

Sixty Symbols, University of Nottingham
IUPAC - Gold Book

Measurement
 
Empirical laws
Constant
Scientific laws